Dedi Baron (Hebrew: דדי ברון, born on July 17, 1954) is an Israeli theatre and opera director who works and creates in Israel, Germany, Australia and teaches directing and acting.

Biography 
Dedi Baron is a graduate of the Tel-Aviv University, where she majored in theater arts (1998) and the higher education school of plastic arts in Zurich, Switzerland. She has completed a continuing education program on full scholarship in the “Royal Court” theatre in London (1997) and was sent by the Goethe Institute to a four-month continuing education program on top theatres on Berlin and Hamburg (2003). Baron is in a domestic partnership with the playwright and screenwriter Shlomi Moskovitz and is a mother of four daughters. The two have one daughter together – Omer Moskovitz, who is a songwriter and a singer, as well as three daughters from her previous marriage to  Alexander Blankstein: Michal Bernshtein – theatre, film and television actress, creator and lecturer, Tal Blankstein – actress, creator and Iyengar Yoga instructor, and Dana Blankstein-Cohen, film and television director, who is the manager of the Sam Spiegel and Television School.

Theater, film and television directing career
Baron has directed dozens of plays in Israel and around the world. Since 1999 she has directed in all the repertory theatres in Tel-Aviv (Cameri, Habima, Beit Lessin), and since 2006 – also in top theatres in Germany, Austria and also in the German opera.
Since 2007 she has worked as a directing lecturer on the theatre department in Tel-Aviv University in MA program; Baron is also a coach for final productions.

Israel

Europe

Director of Special Projects 

.

TV Director

Opera Director

Academic and pedagogic career

Festival judging  
 Judge in the "Thespis" festival for mono-dramas, Kiel, Germany.
 Judge in Theatronetto - mono-dramas festival.
 A member of artistic committees of the Haifa Children Theater Festival and of "HaBama" workshops.

Awards and recognition
	Ora Goldenberg's award for directing, given for directing the play “A Week”, on Habima theatre, 2004. 
	Joseph Milo's award for director of the year, for directing the play “This is the Great Sea” in the Cameri Theater.
	The play “A Week” was invited to the “Méditerranée” festival in Milan, Italy.
	In 2007 Dedi Baron was invited to participate in the “largest round table in the world” on Babelplatz in Berlin, alongside 112 of the “people that have the most positive affect on the world”, including: Wim Wenders, Laurie Anderson, Terry Gilliam, Willem Dafoe, Bianca Jagger and others.

Creative process 
In her interviews, Baron has told about the differences her work in Israel vs. in Germany. For example, in an interview for “Time Out Tel-Aviv she stated the following: “In Germany I am working while my only concern is dealing with the creation and not taking the audience into account, without any artistic compromise. I mostly work on classic materials such as ‘Hedda Gabler’ and ‘Romeo and Juliet’ and this is a process of studying, searching, evolving. There is a lot of frustration on my part because of the gap between working there, with a sense of peace, and working in Israel. Germany is a place where the theater enables you to dream and is at your service, fulfilling these dreams. In Israel I dream differently. Here (In Israel) I am ‘Dedi with limitations’, who is not as good as ’Dedi without limitations’, and this upsets me, I admit. Perhaps that is because I do reach artistic satisfaction twice a year over there (In Germany), so I have lower ambitions to fight for it here.”.

Baron’s partner, playwriter Shlomi Moskovitz, says about their joint work: “I am blessed to live with Dedi Baron, who is not only my love, but also a truly tremendous director. So I just let go. I rarely show up at rehearsals, I seldom arrive, and I think that as the years go by I’ve learnt to let go more and more. Because in the beginning, while working on previous plays with Dedi, it was very hard for me. She would say: ‘Look, this sentence is redundant, we are cutting it out.’ This would stress me out enormously, I would refuse, and start getting into arguments. I think that during the process of rehearsals for ‘A Star will Shine’ I learned to let go, to cut things out. That play speaks about cutting things out and, suddenly, I'm telling myself: ’Come on, I am talking about cutting things out, when I can’t even do it myself!’. I have this sentence that I am in love with, and Dedi says: ’Listen, you’re right, it is lovely, but it doesn’t sit well inside the situation. We don’t need it, this is subtext, let’s get rid of it’. And I think I learned that”.

Critical acclaim 
	“Post-Trauma”: “Creatively directed by Dedi Baron and Tal Brenner, with an energetic and precise performance of all the cast, this is a young-at-heart play, providing a fresh, uninhibited perspective of the trauma of both sides” (Shay Bar-Yaakov, “third and a half generation”, “Yedioth Ahronoth”, January 5, 2011).
	“A Star will Shine”: “Baron’s direction is precise and full of ideas, and those allow the drama to transpire, with the help of an excellent cast” (Maya Nahum Shachal, Calcalist, January 6, 2011).
	“Tasting Meal”: “What makes this play an actual delight is the polished performance, that the director, Baron, has managed to produce from the talented case, including Limor Goldstein, Motti Katz, Aya Granit Shva, Yoav Levi, Hadar Baruch, David Shaul. All of them are doing their work with great skill and create an entertaining play, maintaining the correct balance between dramatic and playful moments” (Shay Bar-Yaakov, “The last wedding vision”, “Yedioth Ahronoth”, April 4, 2016).
	“A Tasting Meal”: “Both play and direction are on a slightly higher wavelength than usually in the Israeli theatre, and set an ambiance of a rare refinement. This could be due to the fact that the majority of Dedi Baron's plays during the last years were staged in the German theatre, of all places. The German influence manifests itself in the minimalistic décor, which is based on an amusing object, designed by Dana Tzarfati – a sort of huge sofa, with multiple seats, acting as a stage within a stage, giving an ironic conclusion to the history of the sofa as a décor in the Israeli theatre days” (Marat Parkhomovsky, “A Tasting Meal: A refined bourekas comedy”. "City Mouse", April 11, 2016).
	“This is the Great Sea”: “Director Dedi Baron has put together a delicate and beautiful play, with a lovely balance between realistic and stylish, using very impressive movement work designed by Yehezkel Lazarov, who is also very convincing as the lead actor, and brings emotional depth and enchanting charm to the play” (Shay Bar-Yaakov, “Life work”. Yedioth Ahronoth, March 12, 2007).
	“The Retreat from Moscow”: “The clean and designed directing by Baron, enabled by IlIl Earm’s beautiful design, and by Ori Vidislavski’s excellent soundtrack, help to develop an ironic, somewhat distant look on the raging drama, and is a great contributor to the evening’s success. In conclusion – a smart, touching play, that reminds us just how much love is fragile and the scope of faith it takes to survive it’s wreckage” (Shay Bar-Yaakov, “Surviving the wreckage of love”. Yedioth Ahronoth, April 3, 2005).
	“A Week”: “Playwright Shlomi Moskovitz and director Dedi Baron have created the play ‘A Week’ together, in Habima; a poetic play about an old lover revisiting and enticing a grown woman, sweeping her away from her family and the life she was accustomed to. This special play, which combines alternative biblical interpretations with sensitive dialogues and is full of linguistic accuracy, has turned into a thrilling play, due to the sensitive direction and committed performance of four terrific actors – Idit Teperson and Mohammad Bakri both of whom have significant mileage on stage, and along them – Ofer Zohar and Michal Varshai – who are not as known, but are just as talented” (“The best in the city – Shay Bar-Yaakov sums up the theatre season””, Yedioth Ahronoth, August 15th, 2003).

References

External links
 Dedi Baron in the HaBima Theater archive
 Dedi Baron on Israeli Opera website
 Dedi Baron on Habama website
 Marat Parkhomovsky, "They Have Somebody to Lean On", joint interview with Dedi Baron and Shlomi Moskovitz, Time-Out magazine, September 17th, 2013.
 Ruthy Zoarets, "Since when can't you dream in plays?" Interview with Dedi Baron. "Maariv", July 30th, 2017.
 Dedi Baron talks about her play "A Star Will Shine" on Habima Theater Youtube channel.
 Interview with Dedi Baron about the play "Falling out of Time" (German) in Krefeld
 Dedi Baron in: Shimon Lev-Ari, "100-year Guide to the Hebrew Theater", on the website of the Faculty of Drama, Tel-Aviv University.

1954 births
Living people
People from Tel Aviv
Israeli theatre directors
Israeli opera directors